Stoy is a village in Crawford County, Illinois, United States. The population was 108 at the 2020 census.

Geography
Illinois Route 33 runs along the northern border of the village, leading east  to Robinson, the county seat, and west  to Oblong.

Demographics
As of the 2020 census there were 108 people, 65 households, and 55 families residing in the village. The racial makeup of the village was 96.30% White and 3.70% from two or more races. None of the population was Hispanic or Latino of any race.

There were 65 households, out of which 44.62% had children under the age of 18 living with them, 76.92% were married couples living together, none had a female householder with no husband present, and 15.38% were non-families. 15.38% of all households were made up of individuals, and 4.62% had someone living alone who was 65 years of age or older. The average household size was 2.42 and the average family size was 2.25.

The village's age distribution consisted of 19.9% under the age of 18, 19.2% from 18 to 24, 16.4% from 25 to 44, 35.6% from 45 to 64, and 8.9% who were 65 years of age or older. The median age was 40.6 years. For every 100 females, there were 156.1 males. For every 100 females age 18 and over, there were 129.4 males.

The median income for a household in the village was $75,208, and the median income for a family was $65,764. Males had a median income of $35,096 versus $25,833 for females. The per capita income for the village was $27,947. No families and 1.4% of the population were below the poverty line, including none of those under age 18 and none of those age 65 or over.

References

Villages in Crawford County, Illinois
Villages in Illinois
Populated places established in 1906
1906 establishments in Illinois